The Poland ambassador to the United Nations is the leader of the Poland delegation, Poland Mission to the United Nations. The position is formally known as the permanent representative of Poland to the United Nations, with the rank and status of ambassador extraordinary and plenipotentiary.

As with all Poland Ambassadors, the ambassador to the UN is nominated by the President of Poland and confirmed by the Parliamentary Commission of the Foreign Affairs. The ambassador serves at the pleasure of the president, and enjoys full diplomatic immunity.

The current ambassador is Krzysztof Szczerski, who was nominated by President Andrzej Duda in 2021.

List of Ambassadors

References 

United Nations
Poland and the United Nations
Permanent Representatives of Poland to the United Nations